is a Japanese football player for Renofa Yamaguchi on loan from Júbilo Iwata.

National team career
In October 2013, Ishida was elected Japan U-17 national team for 2013 U-17 World Cup. He played 3 matches.

Club statistics
Updated to 19 February 2019.

References

External links

Profile at Zweigen Kanazawa
Profile at Júbilo Iwata

1996 births
Living people
Association football people from Shizuoka Prefecture
Japanese footballers
J1 League players
J2 League players
J3 League players
Júbilo Iwata players
Zweigen Kanazawa players
Renofa Yamaguchi FC players
J.League U-22 Selection players
SC Sagamihara players
Association football defenders